JoAnne L. Buth (born May 23, 1954) is a Canadian retired politician. She was appointed to the Canadian Senate by Governor General David Johnston on the advice of Prime Minister Stephen Harper on January 6, 2012, replacing the retired Sharon Carstairs. She sat as a Conservative. She retired from the Senate on August 10, 2014 in order to become CEO of the Canadian International Grains Institute, a group that promotes Canadian field crops.

She has a B.Sc. in biology from the University of Winnipeg and an M.Sc. in entomology from the University of Manitoba.

Buth's background in agriculture includes stints as a research and development manager with DowElanco Canada and as an information officer for the federal agriculture department's research station in Winnipeg. More recently she worked in Carman, Manitoba as a manager and weed management specialist in Manitoba's provincial ministry of agriculture. Prior to her Senate appointment, she was president of the Canola Council of Canada, a lobby group for the canola industry.

References

External links
 Senate biography
 

Canadian senators from Manitoba
Conservative Party of Canada senators
Women members of the Senate of Canada
Living people
1954 births
21st-century Canadian politicians
21st-century Canadian women politicians